Ligidium elrodii is a species of rock slater in the family Ligiidae found in North America.

Subspecies
These five subspecies belong to the species L. elrodii:
 L. e. chatoogaensis Schultz, 1970
 L. e.  elrodii (Packard, 1873)
 L. e.  hancockensis Schultz, 1970
 L. e.  leensis Schultz, 1970
 L. e.  scottensis Schultz, 1970

References

Isopoda
Articles created by Qbugbot
Crustaceans described in 1873